The 2022 FIS Alpine Ski South American Cup was the  season, the second international level competition in alpine skiing.

Men

Calendar

Rankings

Overall

Downhill

Super-G

Giant slalom

Slalom

Alpine combined

Women

Calendar

Rankings

Overall

Downhill

Super-G

Giant slalom

Slalom

Alpine combined

References 

2022 in alpine skiing
2023 in alpine skiing